Branimir "Brana" Porobić (5 January 1901 – 18 December 1952) was a Serbian footballer. He was one of the pioneers of Serbian football as one of the founders of SK BUSK and a member of the club direction of BSK Belgrade.

Biography
Born in Belgrade, he escaped to France during World War I where he finished high-school and played there in Lyon. When he returned to Belgrade he joined BSK Belgrade in 1918 and played as a full-back.  He debuted for the first team of BSK in 1919. That year he moved to another Belgrade club, BUSK, but in 1921 he returned to giants BSK bringing with him two of his BUSK teammates, Aleksandar Milošević and Dušan Zdravković. He played with BSK until 1926.

He was part of the first Yugoslav national team squad which was gathered to play in the 1920 Summer Olympics and he played in the second match on September 2, 1920 against Egypt.  He also played 7 matches for the Belgrade Football Subassociation selection.

He was a member of the BSK direction board, and was one of the founders and a number 1 member of another club, SK BUSK.  During the Second World War he was an officer in the French Army in the French occupation zone in the Allied-occupied Germany. He died in Osnabrück, West Germany, on September 25, 1973.

References

1901 births
1952 deaths
Footballers from Belgrade
Serbian footballers
Yugoslav footballers
Yugoslavia international footballers
Olympic footballers of Yugoslavia
Footballers at the 1920 Summer Olympics
OFK Beograd players
Yugoslav First League players
Expatriate footballers in France
Association football defenders